MI 2: The Movie (also known as MI 2) is the second studio album by Nigerian rapper M.I Abaga. It was released on November 23, 2010, by Chocolate City. The album features guest appearances from 2face Idibia, Bola Adebisi, Brymo, Flavour, Ice Prince, Jesse Jagz, Julius Ceaser, Femi Odukoya, Loose Kaynon, Praiz, Ruby Gyang, Timaya and Waje. M.I addresses a wide array of topics on the album, including corruption, poor education, the Niger Delta crisis, shooting, looting, and the sexual objectification of women. The album was ranked as the best Nigerian album of 2010 by music blog Jaguda. It won Best Rap Album and was nominated for Album of the Year at The Headies 2011.

Background
MI 2: The Movie is predominantly hip hop, but contains elements of highlife and R&B. Throughout the album, M.I incorporates the use of drum loop patterns, congas, and melodious strings. The album's title is derived from the movie Mission: Impossible. In November 2010, M.I said the album would consists of a movie and an original soundtrack. Chocolate City revealed that the movie would have three premieres. The first premiere would be an invite-only affair for industry insiders, while the second would be dedicated to three hundred lucky fans. On December 10, 2010, M.I held a release party for the album at A-Lounge in Abuja.

Composition
In the energetic track "Action Film", M.I declares his accomplishments and grand return. The subtle track "Slow Down" has been described as an ode to the beautification and characterization of women. The Flavour N'abania-assisted track "Number 1" is a blend of hip hop and highlife. In "Anybody", M.I addresses the hatred associated with fame. "Nobody" features guest vocals by 2Baba and tows the same line of the previous track. In "Beef", M.I responds to Iceberg Slim’s diss track and ridicules Kelly Handsome. "Wild Wild West" depicts the ills and sudden unrest in Jos. In "Craze", M.I addresses the state of corruption in Nigeria.

The melodious track "My Head My Belle" addresses the everyday norms of society. “Epic” features blissful chants from Nigerian singer Praiz. In "Undisputed", M.I proclaims to be a king, describing his present reign as untouchable. The Waje-assisted track "One Naira" has been described as a soulful record because of lyrics like "hey princess, I’m so into you/ ‘cause you see pass what my revenue is/ and love me for me, clever you/leave you that is something I’ll never do". In "Imperfect Me", M.I's close friends revealed that one of his faults is his air of haughtiness.

Singles
The album's lead single "Undisputed" was released on November 2, 2010. It was released amid reports about M.I's desire to venture into Nollywood. An accompanying music video for "Undisputed" was released in March 2011, along with an animated video for the album's opener "Prelude". The Brymo-assisted track "Action Film" was released as the album's second single on December 10, 2010. An animated video for the song was released in June 2011.

The album's third single "Beef" was released on December 19, 2010. It is a diss track targeted at Kelly Handsome and Iceberg Slim. "Nobody" was released as the album's fourth single. A leaked version of the song appeared on several blog sites in February 2010. In it, 2face Idibia appeared on the third verse.

Critical reception

MI 2: The Movie received positive reviews from music critics. Music journalist Osagie Alonge doesn't believe M.I is the most lyrically dexterous Nigerian rapper, but ended the review saying the album's "strong attitude and musical concept stays intact from start to finish". Reviewing for Nigerian Entertainment Today, Chiagoziem Onyekwena said the album shows M.I's "willingness to expand his sound, collaborating with artistes outside his comfort zone, toying with singing in patois and crucially, experimenting with an ingenious way to present music to the public".

Ladybrille magazine’s Uduak Oduok commended M.I for not putting out a braggadocious album and said it has "so much substance". Dafe Ivwurie of the Daily Independent newspaper said the album "strikes a balance between hardcore and commercial rap". A writer for Jaguda.com characterized it as lacking the "wow" factor and said it would sound better if the movie skits were omitted.

Accolades

Track listing

Personnel
Credits adapted from the album's back cover.

Audu Maikori – executive producer
Paul Okeugo – executive producer
Yahaya Maikori – executive producer
Jude Abaga – primary artist, writer, executive producer, mixing, mastering
E-Kelly – producer
Tobi – producer
Studio Magic – producer
Jesse Garba Abaga  – featured artist, vocals, writer
Panshak Zamani – featured artist, vocals, writer, A&R
Olawale Ashimi – featured artist, vocals, writer
Innocent Ujah Idibia – featured artist, vocals, writer
Enitimi Alfred Odom – featured artist, vocals, writer
Aituaje Iruobe – featured artist, vocals, writer
Chinedu Okoli – featured artist, vocals, writer
Julius Ceaser – featured artist, vocals, writer
Joakin Ikazoboh – featured artist, vocals, writer
Praise Ugbede Adejo – featured artist, vocals, writer
Ngohide GyangGyang – featured artist, vocals, writer
Femi Odukoya – featured artist, vocals, writer
Bola Adebisi – featured artist, vocals, writer
Kunle Peter Thomas – project coordinator
Terver Malu – general manager, chief financial officer
Doosuur Tilley Gyado – A&R
Lolwa Adamson – A&R
Kelechi Amadi Obi – photography
Toni Tones – photography
Ogbonnaya Williams Chukwudi – design
Abuchi "Don Boos Boos" Ugwu – mixing, mastering 
Rytchus Era Productions – production company
AHBU Ventures – distribution

Release history

References

2010 albums
M.I albums
Chocolate City (music label) albums